Minonoa pachitea is a moth in the family Dalceridae. It was described by Walter Hopp in 1922. It is found in Peru. The habitat consists of tropical moist and/or tropical dry forests.

The length of the forewings is 10 mm. The apical and basal areas of the forewings are dark fuscous with a broad orange band between them and orange projecting into the apical area from the middle of the apical side of the band. The hindwings are dark fuscous.

References

Moths described in 1902
Dalceridae